Bertolotti's syndrome is a commonly missed cause of back pain which occurs due to lumbosacral transitional vertebrae (LSTV). It is a congenital condition but is not usually symptomatic until one's later twenties or early thirties. However, there are a few cases of Bertolotti's that become symptomatic at a much earlier age.

It is named for Mario Bertolotti, an Italian physician who first described it in 1917.

Presentation
A chronic, persistent low back pain along with buttock pain is the most important presentation. Radicular pain is observed.

Pathophysiology
Bertolotti's syndrome is characterized by sacralization of the lowest lumbar vertebral body and lumbarization of the uppermost sacral segment. It involves a total or partial unilateral or bilateral fusion of the transverse process of the lowest lumbar vertebra to the sacrum, leading to the formation of a transitional 5th lumbar vertebra. Of importance is that this syndrome will result in a pain generating 4th lumbar disc resulting in a "sciatic" type of a pain correlating to the 5th lumbar nerve root. Usually the transitional vertebra will have a "spatulated" transverse process on one side resulting in articulation or partial articulation with the sacrum or at time the ilium and in some cases with both. This results in limited / altered motion at the lumbo-sacral articulation. This loss of motion will then be compensated for at segments superior to the transitional vertebra resulting in accelerated degeneration and strain through the L4 disc level which can become symptomatic and inflame the adjacent L5 nerve root resulting in "sciatic" or radicular pain patterns. Scoliosis is frequently found to be associated.

Diagnosis
The diagnosis depends on appropriate patient history backed by imaging studies like X ray and MRI. Lumbosacral spine radiographs help in the identification of the skeletal abnormality. MRI helps in confirmation.

Treatment
Non surgical treatments include steroid injections in the lower back or radiofrequency sensory ablation. Physical therapy interventions are also helpful in early cases and are focused around mobilization, neural stretching, and core strengthening exercises. Surgical intervention is usually a last resort if all conservative methods fail. It can be treated surgically with posterolateral fusion or resection of the transitional articulation.

References

Further reading

External links

Pain